Francisco Javier Sepulveda Riveros (born 3 September 1991) is a Chilean footballer who currently plays for Rangers.

References

1991 births
Living people
Chilean footballers
Chilean Primera División players
C.D. Antofagasta footballers
Deportes Copiapó footballers
Association football defenders